The earthcreepers are several South American species of birds in the family Furnariidae:

 Genus Upucerthia:
 White-throated earthcreeper (Upucerthia albigula)
 Scale-throated earthcreeper (Upucerthia dumetaria)
 Plain-breasted earthcreeper (Upucerthia jelskii)
 Striated earthcreeper (Upucerthia serrana)
 Buff-breasted earthcreeper (Upucerthia validirostris)
 Genus Ochetorhynchus:
 Rock earthcreeper (Ochetorhynchus andaecola) – formerly in genus Upucerthia.
 Straight-billed earthcreeper (Ochetorhynchus ruficaudus ) – formerly in genus Upucerthia.
 Band-tailed earthcreeper (Ochetorhynchus phoenicurus) – formerly in monotypic genus Eremobius.
 Genus Tarphonomus
 Bolivian earthcreeper (Tarphonomus harterti) – formerly in genus Upucerthia.
 Chaco earthcreeper (Tarphonomus certhioides) – formerly in genus Upucerthia.

Birds by common name